Amy Robinson (born 19 February 1996) is a two-sport star for New Zealand. She plays field hockey for New Zealand and is also a National Field and Track Athlete.

Early life and education
Amy Robinson was born in Tauranga, New Zealand. Robinson started participating in athletics at age 4. She started playing field hockey in primary school. Growing up, Robinson played for Tauranga Girls' College and later junior Tauranga alongside future Black Sticks teammate Frances Davies. While in college, Robinson continued to participate in athletics, field hockey, and volleyball. She earned a bachelor's degree in Sport and Recreation.

Career
In field hockey, Robinson plays the position of striker. She was on New Zealand's field hockey team for the 2014 Summer Youth Olympics. She was also on New Zealand's Under-21 team for the field hockey 2016 Junior World Cup. She was added to the New Zealand women's national field hockey team, known as the Black Sticks, in late 2016. Robinson scored a goal in her first game for the New Zealand women's national field hockey team. She participated at the 2020 Women's FIH Pro League.
She also plays field hockey for the Midlands team.

In 2016, Robinson was awarded the Bay of Plenty Junior Sportswoman of the Year. Outside of hockey, Robinson teaches at Tauranga Intermediate. Robinson's primary sport is field hockey, although she also competes in athletics and volleyball. In 2013 she set a New Zealand Under-17 record in 300 m hurdles. She also played for New Zealand's Under-17 beach volleyball team and Under-18 volleyball team.

References

Living people
New Zealand women's volleyball players
New Zealand female field hockey players
Sportspeople from Tauranga
Female field hockey forwards
Field hockey players at the 2014 Summer Youth Olympics
1996 births
Commonwealth Games gold medallists for New Zealand
Field hockey players at the 2018 Commonwealth Games
Commonwealth Games medallists in field hockey
21st-century New Zealand women
Medallists at the 2018 Commonwealth Games